Ncell Axiata Limited (previously Ncell Private Limited) is a mobile service provider from Nepal. Ncell is Nepal's second largest telecommunications company, after Nepal Telecom. The company was founded in 2004 AD and has been providing telecommunications services ever since. It has been the most successful company in the history of telecommunications in Nepal. In addition to growing revenue, it has maintained a high level of service quality.

The journey begins in the year 2004 A.D. There was only one major telecom operator at the time, Nepal Telecom. Nepal Telecom has been providing PSTN and GSM services since the beginning. Investing in telecommunications and competing with governmental agencies was a major risk at the time. However, they were able to expand their service and establish a high-quality network, and within 15 years, they had become a leading telecom operator offering 2G and 4G mobile communication. In addition, it has given FTTH (Fiber to the Home) internet services to business customers and is extending its offerings.

History of Ncell 
 Nepal's first private mobile operator, Spice Nepal Private Limited, was founded in 2004. The company introduced its commercial services as Mero Mobile on 17 September 2005 in Kathmandu.
 TeliaSonera bought a controlling interest in the company in October 2008. TeliaSonera is a leading Swedish telecommunications company and mobile network operator with operations in Sweden, Finland, Norway, Denmark, Lithuania, Latvia, and Estonia.
 Spice Nepal was renamed Ncell on 12 March 2010 as part of the acquisition and Telesoneria invested approximately 1 billion dollars in improvement and coverage of the network.
 Ncell had reached all areas of Nepal by 2010 and had launched 3G services by the end of the year.
 Ncell also constructed the east-west fiber link connectivity during this time, which was necessary to support the data and voice traffic across the country.
 It was announced on 21 December 2015 that TeliaSonera would exit Ncell by selling its 60.4 percent stake in the company to Malaysian telecommunications group Axiata.
 On June 1, 2018, the company began providing 4G/LTE service in the Kathmandu Valley, including Nagarkot, Banepa, and Dhulikhel in the Kavrepalanchowk district.
 Ncell has expanded its 4G/LTE coverage to 45 places in Nepal by the end of June 2019.
 Ncell became a public limited company on 3 August 2020, and its name was changed to Ncell Axiata Limited. Ncell is a long-term investor in Nepal, a subsidiary of the Axiata Group, and continuously works towards its goals of connecting every Nepalese through its network, providing high quality, modern services to consistently create value for its customers and partners.
 Ncell is contributing to Nepal's vision of Digital Nepal and building best-in-class networks and communication services to people residing across the country. Ncell operates the largest 4G network in the country that fulfills the country's need for high-speed mobile broadband and creates new opportunities for the people of Nepal, moving the country towards a more digital future.

Technology 
On 1 June 2017, Ncell launched its 4G/LTE service in Kathmandu Valley (including the areas of Nagarkot, Banepa and Dhulikhel of Kavrepalanchowk district). A month later, the company launched 4G/LTE service in Pokhara and Damauli (two western cities of Nepal). As of December 2021, Ncell expanded 4G/LTE service ensuring access to over 75% of total population, covering all seven Nepali provinces. In a bid to implement a next-generation billing system, Ncell adopted Alibaba's Apsara Cloud for its digital strategy.

In 2010, when Ncell was still owned by TeliaSonera, its highest 3G base station was built near one of the Everest Base Camps at an altitude of 5,200 meters (17,000 feet).

Ncell provides a self-service app which is relied upon by a majority of users. By installing the Ncell app, customers can recharge their account, check balance information, and purchase data/voice packs. The app can be also used to send 10 free SMS messages daily; however, data charges may apply if the app is used outside of Nepal.

See also 
 Nepal Telecom
 Telecommunications in Nepal

References

External links 
 
 IRD examines tax issues in sale of Ncell shares
 Getting to the crux of Ncell buyout deal
What Happens When You Don't Clear Ncell Sapati Amount For Long Time?

Telecommunications companies of Nepal
Private equity portfolio companies
Telecommunications monopolies
2004 establishments in Nepal